Htukkanthein is one of the most famous Buddhist temples in the ancient Arakanese city of Mrauk U, in Rakhine State, Western Myanmar. The name means "Cross-Beam Ordination Hall".

Like most of Mrauk U's Buddhist temples, it is designed as a dual purpose 'fortress-temple'. Although it is a 'thein' (ordination hall), it is one of the most militaristic buildings in Mrauk U, built on raised ground, with a single entrance and small windows. According to Emil Forchhammer, an archaeologist employed by the British Raj to study Mrauk U in the late 19th century, the temples might have been employed as a refuge for the Buddhist religious order in times of war.

The temple enshrining the statues of Buddha was built in 1571 by King Min Phalaung. It is located on a small hill a stone's throw away from the Shite-thaung Temple. At the centre of the temple is a dome topped with a mushroom shaped crown or hti, surrounded by four smaller stupas at the corners. At the facade base of the central dome is a square window designed in such a manner that, at dawn, the sun's rays shine directly onto the main Buddha image inside the central vault. At the west side of the temple is a small meditation chamber, accessible only via the main temple.

The temple is constructed of brick and stone.

The Htukkanthein has three chambers, rotating clockwise inwards. The entire temple has a total of 180 Buddha images in niches (179 smaller ones along the corridors, and 1 at the central vaulted chamber). On each side of the niches are sculpted male and a female figures said to represent the donors who made the construction of the temple possible.

The temple has been claimed to be an inspiration of the ruins founded in Sanhok map of the mobile game PUBG.

See also
 Shite-thaung Temple
 Andaw-thein Ordination Hall
 Htukkanthein Temple
 Koe-thaung Temple
 Le-myet-hna Temple
 Ratanabon Pagoda

References

Pamela Gutman (2001) Burma's Lost Kingdoms: splendours of Arakan. Bangkok: Orchid Press

Buddhist temples in Rakhine State
Tourist attractions in Myanmar
16th-century Buddhist temples
1571 establishments in Asia
16th-century establishments in the Mrauk-U Kingdom
Religious buildings and structures completed in 1571